The Freeport Center is a manufacturing, warehousing, and distribution center located in Clearfield, Utah. It was originally built in 1942 as the Clearfield Naval Supply Depot, which was decommissioned in 1962. A portion of the old Navy Supply Depot now exists as Clearfield Job Corps. This lines the westernmost section of the Freeport Center.

Most buildings have a railroad loading dock on one side, and a truck loading dock on the other.

About 70 companies have manufacturing and distribution facilities in the Freeport Center, including Lifetime Products, Northrop Grumman, Don Julio Foods, and Utility Trailer Manufacturing Company. It is also the former headquarters of defunct roller coaster company Arrow Dynamics.

The Freeport Center's name is a reference to Utah's Freeport Law, enacted in 1966, which exempted inventory held for sale from property taxes.

References

Industrial parks in the United States
Companies based in Clearfield, Utah
Manufacturing companies based in Utah
Industrial buildings and structures in Utah
Transport infrastructure completed in 1942
1942 establishments in Utah
Buildings and structures in Davis County, Utah
Clearfield, Utah